Bradley Wilson Kocher (January 16, 1888 – February 13, 1965) was a catcher in Major League Baseball. He played for the Detroit Tigers and New York Giants.

References

External links

1888 births
1965 deaths
Major League Baseball catchers
Detroit Tigers players
New York Giants (NL) players
Baseball players from Pennsylvania
People from Luzerne County, Pennsylvania
Bridgeport Orators players
Toronto Maple Leafs (International League) players
Providence Grays (minor league) players
Louisville Colonels (minor league) players
Toledo Mud Hens players